Adam Stone is an American professor and political scientist specializing in the area of American politics. Stone is an associate professor at Georgia State University's Perimeter College and a former President of the Georgia Political Science Association.

Education 
Stone received an Bachelor of Arts in Political Science from University of California, Berkeley and a Master of Arts in Politics from Brandeis University in 1988.

Career 
In 1991, Stone joined the faculty of DeKalb College (now Perimeter College). He is currently the Associate Department Chair for Social Science at the Alpharetta Campus. He is an associate professor in the department of History and Political Science. In 2004, Stone served as the President of the Georgia Political Science Association. Stone is editor-in-chief of Questions in Politics, the academic journal of the Georgia Political Science Association. Stone has appeared in and been quoted in the media on topics related to politics and political science. These publications include The Atlanta Journal-Constitution, Georgia Public Broadcasting, Gwinnett Daily Post, WABE, Rome News-Tribune, Atlanta Business Chronicle, and CBS News.

In May 2019, Stone appeared on the television trivia game show Jeopardy!. He went up against long time Jeopardy! champion and record setter James Holzhauer.

References 

American political scientists
Georgia State University faculty
Perimeter College at Georgia State University faculty
University of California, Berkeley alumni
Brandeis University alumni
Living people
Year of birth missing (living people)